Dawit Abraha Mebratu (born 13 June 1984 in Ethiopia) is an Ethiopian football midfielder. He currently plays for Saint-George SA.

International career
Mebratu was a member of the Ethiopia national football team, and was part of the Ethiopia squad at the 2001 FIFA World Youth Cup.

External links

References

1984 births
Living people
Ethiopian footballers
Association football midfielders
Ethiopia international footballers